A psaltery (or sawtry, an archaic form) is a fretboard-less box zither (a simple chordophone) and is considered the archetype of the zither and dulcimer; the harp, virginal, harpsichord and clavichord were also inspired by it. Its resonance box is usually trapezoidal, rectangular or in the form of a "pig's head" and often richly decorated.

Etymology

The psaltery of Ancient Greece (epigonion) was a harp-like stringed instrument. The word psaltery derives from the Ancient Greek ψαλτήριον  (psaltḗrion), "stringed instrument, psaltery, harp" and that from the verb ψάλλω (psállō), "to touch sharply, to pluck, pull, twitch" and in the case of the strings of musical instruments, "to play a stringed instrument with the fingers, and not with the plectrum." The psaltery was originally made from wood, and relied on natural acoustics for sound production.

In the King James Bible "psaltery", and its plural, "psalteries", are used to translate several words from the Hebrew Bible whose meaning is now unknown.

Characteristics
While the Greek instruments were harps, psaltery came to mean instruments that were strung across a resonating wood box. The box-zither psalteries may have a Phoenician origin.
The strings of the medieval instrument were usually made of metal, unlike the finger-plucked harp, strung with catgut, and played using a plectrum or “pick.”  The harp is strung with a single string for each tone, open to be plucked from either side of the instrument; a psaltery may have multiple strings for each tone, strung across a soundboard. The psaltery has been compared to the harpsichord and dulcimer, though some forms of the latter are not plucked, but struck with hammers.

Medieval and Renaissance psalteries
From the 12th through the 15th centuries, psalteries are widely seen in manuscripts, paintings and sculpture throughout Europe. Examples found in one reference book, the Groves New Encyclopedia of Musical Instruments, show examples in paintings from the 9th century Carolingian Empire Benedictine Psalter,  in 13th century Spain (in the Cantigas de Santa Maria), in Bohemia in the 14th century, in Italy in the 14th century, and Germany in the 15th century.

Shapes included "triangular, trapezoidal, semitrapezoidal, wing shaped, or harp shaped". The psalterion decacordum was shaped like a square and had ten strings strung vertically. Stings could run in courses, as viewed in the middle-ages artwork.

Modern psaltery
While psalteries had largely died out in Europe by the 19th century, the salterio remained common in Mexico well into the twentieth century and is still played in some regional styles.

The hammered dulcimer and related instruments such as the santur, cimbalom, yangqin, and khim, appear very similar to psalteries and it is often hard to tell which one historical images represent. They differ in that the player strikes the strings with small hammers rather than plucking them. As a result, they have much higher string tension and heavier frames.

In the 19th century, several related zithers came into use, notably the guitar zither and the autoharp. In the 20th century, the bowed psaltery came into wide use. It is set up in a triangular format so that the end portion of each string can be bowed.

Gallery

See also
 Baltic psaltery
 Magadis
 Nevel (instrument)
 Psalterium (instrument)
 Qanun (instrument)

Notes

References

External links

 Psaltery
 Discussion of psalteries, with image from the exhibition  Making Musical Instruments:  The making of musical instruments in Canada by the Canadian Museum of Civilisation

Ancient Greek musical instruments
Ancient Hebrew musical instruments
Box zithers
Czech musical instruments
Greek musical instruments
Slovenian musical instruments